The Nun and the Sergeant is a 1962 Korean War drama film starring Anna Sten and Robert Webber in the title roles. It was produced by Sten's husband Eugene Frenke, who had produced the 1957 film Heaven Knows, Mr Allison, also a pairing of a Catholic nun and a U.S. Marine. It was directed by Franklin Adreon and released through United Artists.

Plot
In a forerunner of The Dirty Dozen, Marine Gunnery Sergeant McGrath (Robert Webber) takes 12 Marines from the brig and trains them to blow up a tunnel behind North Korean lines. McGrath's only friend on the patrol is his Korean guide Pak (Dale Ishimoto). Hating their sergeant, the Marines plan to return to their lines without him, seeing that he becomes "a casualty of war". However, en route to their target they find an injured nun (Anna Sten) and a group of Korean convent girls whose bus has been destroyed.

The Marines change their views when Sgt. McGrath protects the group. When one of their squad (Leo Gordon) attempts to rape one of the young girls, the brig rats turn against him.<ref>p.50 Projansky, Sarah Watching Rape: Film and Television in Post Feminist Culture 2001 NYU Press</ref> They proceed with their mission as Marines.

Cast
 Robert Webber as Sgt. McGrath
 Anna Sten as Nun
 Leo Gordon as Dockman
 Hari Rhodes as Hall
 Robert Easton as Nupert
 Dale Ishimoto as Pak
 Linda Wong as Bok Soon
 Linda Ho as Soon Cha
 Tod Windsor as Nevins
 Valentin de Vargas as Rivas
 Ken Miller as Quill
 Norman Dupont as Mossback
 Roger Torrey as Turnbridge
 Gregori F. Kris as Johnson
 Caroline Kido as Myung Hee

Production
Don Cerveris was an English teacher breaking into screenwriting; one of his pupils was Frank Zappa. Producer Frenke sought Department of Defense cooperation for the film in 1960 when the project was originally titled The Nun and McGrath''. The stars of the film, Robert Webber and Hari Rhodes, and director Franklin Adreon were former Marines.

Notes

External links
 
 
 

1962 films
Korean War films
Films about the United States Marine Corps
War adventure films
Films about Catholic nuns
Films about Catholicism
Films about religion
American black-and-white films
Films directed by Franklin Adreon
Films scored by Jerry Fielding
1960s English-language films